Pullinki is a 335-meter-high mountain in northern Sweden, near the town of Övertorneå. This mountain marks one of the locations for the Struve Geodetic Arc, a world heritage site.

Features 
There is also an alpine ski resort on the mountain. It has a 253-metre altitude difference and 16 slopes.

References 

Mountains of Norrbotten County